Dean Cameron Allen (June 2, 1966January 13, 2018) was a Canadian typographer, web developer and early blogger. He created the markup language Textile, the open source content management system Textpattern, and the web hosting service TextDrive. Textile, called "the world's greatest markup language" by Alec Kinnear of Foliovision, has been used in products such as Salesforce's Desk.com, Know Your Meme, and issue tracking application Jira.

Allen was an early blogger and essayist in the late 1990s at his site Cardigan Industries. He created Textile so that writers could "...Just Write and everything else should be there to support that endeavour."

References

External links

1966 births
2018 deaths
Canadian bloggers
Web developers
Canadian people of Scottish descent
Canadian people of Dutch descent